The Maykopsky otdel was a Cossack district (otdel) of the Kuban oblast of the Caucasus Viceroyalty of the Russian Empire. It bordered the Kavkazsky otdel to the north, the Yekaterinodarsky otdel to the west, the Black Sea Governorate to the south, and the Labinsky and Batalpashinsky otdels to the east. The area of the Maykopsky otdel mostly corresponded to Adygea within Russia. The district was eponymously named for its administrative center, Maykop.

Administrative divisions 
The subcounties (uchastoks) of the Maykopsky otdel in 1912 were as follows:

Demographics

Russian Empire Census 
The majority of the population indicated Russian to be their mother tongue, with a significant Ukrainian speaking minority.

Kavkazskiy kalendar 

Notes

References

Bibliography 

Otdels of Kuban Oblast
Kuban Oblast
Caucasus Viceroyalty (1801–1917)
History of Kuban